The Resurrection (La Resurrezione) is an 800-quintal (80-metric-ton) bronze/copper-alloy sculpture by Pericle Fazzini in the Paul VI Audience Hall in Rome. Intended to capture the anguish of 20th century mankind living under the threat of nuclear war, La Resurrezione depicts Jesus rising from a nuclear crater in the Garden of Gethsemane.

The commission for the work was ordered by Count Galeassi in 1965; casting began at the Michelucci Art Foundry in Pistoia in 1972; the final sketch was produced in 1975; and the work was completed and inaugurated on 28 September 1977.

The original work was done in polystyrene and the fumes of the burning plastic gave Fazzini a blood clot during its production. The statue was restored over three months in 2011.

In commemoration of the 2013 Easter, the Vatican Post issued a postal stamp depicting the sculpture.

See also
 Index of Vatican City-related articles
 List of statues of Jesus

References

1977 sculptures
Vatican City culture
Christian art about death
Statues of Jesus
Sculptures in Vatican City
Nuclear war and weapons in popular culture
Christ in the Garden of Gethsemane in art